, subtitled Mikyuki Nakajima Best Album – The collection of most famous and finest songs, is a compilation album by Japanese singer-songwriter Miyuki Nakajima, released on March 21, 1996. The album features her most commercially successful singles "Between the Sky and You (Sora to Kimi no Aida ni)", "Shallow Sleep (Asai Nemuri)", "Wanderer's Song (Tabibito no Uta)", and "Bad Girl (Akujo)", and mainly consists of her singles that came out during the 1990s. It also includes well-recognized songs like "Rouge" (became famous by cover version Faye Wong recorded), although her earlier massive hit singles such as "Yūwaku" and "Unrequited Love (Yokorenbo)" were disregarded.

Daiginjō debuted at the number-one on the Japanese Oricon Weekly albums chart with sales of 210,000 copies, outselling The Beatles' Anthology 2 released in the same week.

Track listing

Chart positions

Release history

References

1996 greatest hits albums
Miyuki Nakajima compilation albums